Barcelona Sporting Club's 2011 season was the club's 86th year of existence, the 58th year in professional football, and the 53rd in the top level of professional football in Ecuador. In the first stage of the Serie A, Barcelona finished 8th and failed to qualify to the season-ending finals. In the Second Stage, the club finished 2nd and failed again to qualify to the season-ending finals because of the overall board.

Competitions

Pre-season friendlies
Barcelona played three friendly matches in addition to La Noche Amarilla, the club's official presentation for the season. Their opponent for La Noche Amarilla was Deportes Tolima from Colombia.

Serie A

First stage
The First Stage of the season ran from January 30 to June 19. Barcelona finished 8th and failed to qualify to the season-ending Finals and the 2012 Copa Libertadores during this stage.

Second stage

Other friendlies

See also
Barcelona Sporting Club
2011 in Ecuadorian football

References

External links
Official website 
Unofficial website 

Barcelona S.C. seasons
Barcelona